Events in the year 1989 in Turkey.

Parliament
18th Parliament of Turkey

Incumbents
President –
 Kenan Evren (up to 9 November)
Turgut Özal (from 9 November)
Prime Minister –
 Turgut Özal (up tp 9 November)
Yıldırım Akbulut (from 9 November)
Leader of the opposition – Erdal İnönü

Ruling party and the main opposition
 Ruling party – Motherland Party (ANAP) 
 Main opposition – Social Democratic Populist Party (SHP)

Cabinet
46th government of Turkey (up to 9 November)
47th government of Turkey (from 9 November)

Events

June 
 11 June – Some 2,000 Bulgarian Turks deported to Turkey following forced name changes.
 11 June – Fenerbahçe wins the championship of the championship
 15 June – 4 new provinces established: Aksaray, Bayburt, Karaman and Kırıkkale

September 
 17 September – Central Bank announces that rescheduled foreign debts have been repaid.

October 
 21 October – Two Syrian warplanes shoot down a civil cartography plane within Turkey, killing five.
 31 October – Parliament elects Prime Minister Turgut Özal as President.

September 
17 September – Weightlifter Naim Süleymanoğlu wins 4 gold medals in the Athens World Weightlifting Championships.

November 
 9 November – President Turgut Özal appoints Yıldırım Akbulut as the new prime minister.
 17 November – Yıldırım Akbulut elected chairman of Motherland Party.
 29 November – Turkey approves European Social Charter.

December 
 8 December – The United Communist Party announces its intention to regain its legal status.

Births
1 January – Fatih Avan, javelin thrower
27 January – Melek Hu (Naturalized citizen), table tennis player
28 January – Gamze Tazim, actress
9 February – Deniz Aslan, footballer
22 February – Gülşah Gümüşay, basketball player
21 May – Gülcan Mıngır, middle distance runner
5 July – Dilara Buse Günaydın, swimmer
10 September – Tolga Ünlü, footballer
28 September – Çağla Büyükakçay, tennis player
10 October – Rıza Kayaalp, wrestler
29 October – Leyla Tuğutlu, model and beauty pageant contestant
8 November - Can Yaman, actor
10 December – İlknur Melis Durası, engineer and model

Deaths

January 
 January 12 - Adil Candemir, wrestler (b. 1917)
 January 20
 Mete Adanır, footballer (b. 1961)
 Muzaffer Badalıoğlu, footballer (b. 1960)

February 
 February 15 - Hüseyin Akbaş, wrestler (b. 1933)

March 
 March 6 - Fecri Ebcioğlu, songwriter and composer,  (b. 1929)
 March 13 - Fahrettin Özdilek, military officer, politician and interim Prime Minister of Turkey  (b. 1898)

April - June 
 April 16 - Hakkı Yeten, footballer, football manager and sports executive  (b. 1910)
 April 18
 Adil Atan, wrestler (b. 1929)
 Candan Tarhan, footballer and football manager (b. 1942)
 June 24 – Saadet Çağatay, turkologist, professor and writer(b. 1907)

July 
 July 15 - Nesuhi Ertegün, record producer and executive of Atlantic Records (b. 1925)

August  
 August 14 – Bergen, singer (b. 1959)

September 
 September 13 – İsmail Rüştü Aksal, civil servant and politician (b. 1911)
 September 21 – Ertem Eğilmez, film director, producer and screenwriter (b. 1929)

October - December 
 October 9 – Yusuf Atılgan, novelist (b. 1921)
 December 15 – Ali Şen, actor (b. 1918)

Gallery

See also
Turkey in the Eurovision Song Contest 1989
 1988–89 1.Lig

References

 
Years of the 20th century in Turkey
Turkey
Turkey
Turkey